was a general in the Imperial Japanese Army in the Second Sino-Japanese War. A noted China expert within the Japanese military, he was a leading figure in the Trautmann mediation effort to bring a negotiated end to the war.

Biography

Early military career
Tada was the second son of a former samurai retainer of Sendai Domain from Sendai, and was adopted by his uncle. After attending military preparatory schools, he graduated from the 15th class of the Imperial Japanese Army Academy in 1903, specializing in the artillery, and as a junior officer, served with the IJA 18th Field Artillery Regiment at the Siege of Port Arthur during the Russo-Japanese War.

He graduated from the 25th class of the Army War College in 1913. the same year, he married a daughter of Daisaku Komoto, who was later famous for his involvement in the Huanggutun incident to assassinate Chinese warlord Zhang Zuolin. Tada served as an instructor to the Chinese National Revolutionary Army at the Beijing Military Academy from 1917 and rose to the position of senior military advisor to Chinese President Li Yuanhong. He became fluent in Mandarin Chinese and developed close personal contacts with many leading Chinese military and political figures of the time. Tada departed China on assignment to Vladivostok as part of the Siberian Expeditionary Army.  From 1920 to 1923 he was an instructor at the Army Staff College,  and visited the United States from July 1924 to May 1925. He returned to China from March 1926 to July 1927.In July 1927, he was promoted to colonel and resumed his post as  an instructor at the Army Staff College. From March 1928, he was commander of the IJA 4th Field Artillery Regiment, and from May 1930 was chief of staff of the IJA 16th Division.

Second Sino-Japanese War
Tada returned to the Beijing Military Academy from March 1931, and was assigned to the Kwantung Army from April 1932, serving a senior military advisor to Manchukuo. He was promoted to major general in August. It has been alleged that Princess Aisin Gioro Xianyu (Yoshiko Kawashima) was his mistress. From April 1934, he was made commander of the IJA 6th Field Artillery Brigade and in August 1935 became commander in chief of the China Garrison Army. Tada was instrumental in establishing the East Hebei Autonomous Government later that year. 

Tada was promoted to lieutenant general in April 1936 and assumed command of the IJA 11th Division in May 1936. With the outbreak of the Second Sino-Japanese War,  he was recalled to Japan in August 1937 to become Vice Chief of the Imperial Japanese Army General Staff. He concurrently held the post of Commandant of the Army Staff College.

After the Marco Polo Bridge Incident, Tada attempted to contact Kuomintang leader Chiang Kai-shek to defuse tensions between Japan and China in an effort at mediation sponsored by the German Ambassador to China, Oskar Trautmann. Tada argued that both countries faced the same external threat from the Soviet Union and internal threat from communism, and should not waste precious resources fighting one another; however, Tada's efforts were overruled by Prime Minister Fumimaro Konoe, Army Minister Hajime Sugiyama, Navy Minister Mitsumasa Yonai and Foreign Minister Kōki Hirota, all of whom berated Tada for attempting to effect private diplomacy.

Tada returned to China in December 1938 as commander of the IJA Third Army and in September 1939, he was promoted to commander of the North China Area Army. He was awarded the German Grand Cross of Order of the German Eagle in January 1940, and the Japanese  Order of the Golden Kite, 2nd class in July 1941, and was promoted to full general. He retired from active military service two months later and moved to Tateyama, Chiba for the remainder of the war.

Post-war
After the surrender of Japan, Tada was placed under home arrest by the SCAP occupation authorities. He was charged with "Class A" war crimes, and was called as a witness for the prosecution against Iwane Matsui, Seishiro Itagaki, and Kenji Dohihara. Despite his position as a prosecution witness, he asserted the legitimacy of Japan's position in China. He died of his stomach cancer at his home in Tateyama on 18 December 1948, before the end of the trial. It was revealed a week after his death that all charges against him had been dropped.

References

Films
Hundred Regiments Offensive (film)

External links

 Japanese bio site

Notes

Japanese generals
1882 births
1948 deaths
Military personnel from Miyagi Prefecture
Imperial Japanese Army generals of World War II
Japanese military attachés
Japanese military personnel of the Russo-Japanese War
People of the Second Sino-Japanese War
Deaths from cancer in Japan
Japanese anti-communists
Recipients of the Order of the Sacred Treasure, 1st class
Grand Cordons of the Order of the Rising Sun